Oscar Rojas may refer to:

Oscar Rojas (Chilean footballer) (born 1958), Chilean football defender
Óscar Rojas (Costa Rican footballer) (born 1979), Costa Rican football midfielder
Óscar Rojas (Mexican footballer) (born 1981), Mexican football right-back